The Purdy Islands (or Mwilitau Islands) are an uninhabited island group in the Bismarck Sea, belonging to the people of M'Buke Island in Manus, Papua New Guinea. The Purdy Islands, Mole, Mouse, Rat, plus Bat and Alim (or North Bat and South Bat), form part of the Admiralty Islands group, in Manus Province.

History
The islands are owned by the Mbuke people.
They were named after hydrographer John Purdy by his friend Captain Abraham Bristow on 16 February 1817.  Bat Island was the site of RAAF radar station 340 RS between March 1944 and April 1944 during the Second World War. It was one of five such radar stations located within the Admiralty Islands to support the American Invasion. Bat Island proved to be a very dangerous location because it was infested with rats that carried  mites which in turn carried Scrub typhus. The majority of the 30 or so strong unit succumbed to Scrub typhus and the station was abandoned after just over a month of service. A contingent of survivors and reinforcements returned in May 1944 to collect the mobile LW-AW radar station and all the equipment that had been left behind. There is one survivor of this radar station still living in Australia as at July 2018.

Geography
Located in the Bismarck Sea, the Purdys are part of the Admiralty Islands group, which also contains Admiralty Island, Jesus Maria Island, Los Reyes Islands, La Vandola Island, Hayrick Island, Platform Island, Small Round Island, High Island, Low Island, San Miguel Island, Elizabeth Island, Anachoretes Island, Los Monjos Island, Boudeuse Island, L'Echiquier Island, Los Eremitanos Islands, Matty Island, Durour Island, and Tiger Island.

The Purdy group includes five islands. These are Alim and Bat (or North Bat and South Bat), as well as Mole, Mouse, and Rat. Bat Island is to the west, Mouse and Mole Islands are to the east, Mole Island is to the northwest of Mouse and Mole. Another reef is southwest of Bat Island. Other formations nearby include the shoals named Sherburne and Sydney, as well as the reefs named Circular and Albert. They consist of coral formations.

Fauna and flora
The uninhabited islands are a breeding ground for the green sea turtle. The islands are visited by people only to exploit the turtle and coconut palm oil.

Further reading
 Krauss, Noel Louis Hilmer (1979), Bibliography of the Purdy Islands, New Guinea

References

External links
 Map including the Purdy Islands

Uninhabited islands of Papua New Guinea